Naadan Premam is a 1972 Indian Malayalam film adaptation of S. K. Pottekkatt's novel of the same name. It is directed by Crossbelt Mani and produced by N. Vishweshwaraiah and P. S. Gopalakrishnan. The film stars Madhu, Sheela, Adoor Bhasi and Prema in the lead roles. The film had musical score by V. Dakshinamoorthy.

Cast
Madhu as Ikkoran
Sheela as Malu 
Adoor Bhasi as Khader Mappila
Prema as Padmini
Sankaradi as Gopalan
T. R. Omana as Paaru
Bahadoor as Chandran
K. P. Ummer as Ravi
S. P. Pillai as Kunjan
Paravoor Bharathan as Ravi's father
Santha Devi as Amina
Thodupuzha Radhakrishnan as club secretary

Soundtrack
The music was composed by V. Dakshinamoorthy and the lyrics were written by P. Bhaskaran.

References

External links
 

1972 films
1970s Malayalam-language films